Gölbaşı is a town (belde) in Güroymak District, Bitlis Province, Turkey. Its population is 4,629 (2021).

References

Towns in Turkey
Populated places in Bitlis Province
Güroymak District